The flying disc events at the 2001 World Games in Akita was played between 17 and 21 August. 72 athletes, from 8 nations, participated in the tournament. The competition took place at Akita Prefectural Central Park Football Studiume, where matches of ultimate were played and on Akita Prefectural Central Park Disc Golf Course, where disc golf was held.

Participating nations

Medal table

Events

References

External links
 World Flying Disc Association
 Flying disc on IWGA website
 Results

 
2001 World Games
2001